The Candaba Viaduct (also known as Pulilan–Apalit Bridge) is a  viaduct carrying the North Luzon Expressway (NLEX) across the Candaba Swamp in the provinces of Bulacan and Pampanga, Philippines consisting of six lanes (three northbound and three southbound). In 1976, it surpassed the San Juanico Bridge (finished 1973) to become the longest bridge in the Philippines. In 2022, it was surpassed by the 8.9 km Cebu–Cordova Link Expressway (CCLEX) and the viaduct is now the second longest bridge in the country.  The viaduct was designed by Aas-Jakobsen and built by Construction Development Corporation of the Philippines (CDCP, later renamed to Philippine National Construction Corporation) as part of construction of the whole NLEX.

Built in 1976, the bridge and the whole stretch of NLEX were constructed as a component project of the International Bank for Reconstruction and Development through the direction of the Ministry of Public Highways.  The project was completed in 1977 and through Presidential Decree No. 1113, then President Ferdinand Marcos granted CDCP the franchise to maintain and operate the NLEX including the Candaba Viaduct.  On February 10, 2005, the operations and maintenance of the whole of NLEX were transferred to the Manila North Tollways Corporation (now NLEX Corporation).

Overlooking Mount Arayat in the east and Zambales Mountains in the west, the viaduct is raised over Candaba Swamp, which keeps the highway open to traffic, even when the swamp gets flooded during the rainy or monsoon season.  Lighting, emergency callboxes and CCTVs along the viaduct are powered by solar panels due to the problem of installing power lines within the viaduct.

The viaduct also serves as a major utility corridor, serving as the right-of-way of relocated San Simon–Pulilan segment of Hermosa–Duhat–Balintawak 230,000-volt transmission line where the said power line segment underwent relocation from February 18, 2008 to June 2011 to accommodate the widening and expansion of MacArthur Highway from San Simon, Pampanga to Calumpit, Bulacan and Pulilan Regional Road from Calumpit to NLEX Pulilan Exit in Pulilan, where the steel poles posed a safety hazard. The Hermosa–San Jose 500,000-volt line, currently under construction, intersects with the viaduct and also visible from it.

In February 2017, it was announced that Candaba Viaduct would be expanded and would have a third lane on both sides of the bridge.

Route description

The Candaba Viaduct passes over Candaba Swamp and adjacent Pampanga River and connects the provinces of Pampanga and Bulacan. Most of its portions are lined with billboards, rice paddies, and some trees.

The viaduct starts at Barangay Dulong Malabon in Pulilan where there are a few houses located under it and after a few meters, it enters the municipality of Calumpit. It enters Pampanga (Apalit) upon approaching a lay-by located before passing an area with palm trees and continues on a straight route. It then passes through Apalit Bypass Road and Pampanga River, by which the parish church is located, visible from the road. A footbridge is located on its southbound lane. The bridge ends after crossing Pampanga River.

See also
North Luzon Expressway
List of bridges in the Philippines

References

External links

Bridges in the Philippines
Buildings and structures in Pampanga
Buildings and structures in Bulacan
Transportation in Pampanga
Transportation in Bulacan
Toll bridges